Ace of Diamond is an anime series based on the manga by Yuji Terajima serialized in Weekly Shōnen Magazine. The TV series was produced by Madhouse and Production I.G and began airing on October 6, 2013, on TX Network stations and later on AT-X. The episodes were simulcast in the United States, Canada, United Kingdom, Ireland, Australia, New Zealand, South Africa, Denmark, Finland, Iceland, the Netherlands, Norway, Sweden, Central and South America, Spain, Brazil, and Portugal by Crunchyroll with English and German subtitles. The series was initially planned to be 52 episodes but was extended until March 2015 for a total of 75 episodes.

Nine pieces of theme musics are used for the episodes: three opening and six ending themes. From episodes 1–25, the opening theme is "Go EXCEED!!" by Tom-H@ck featuring Masayoshi Ōishi, while the ending themes are "Seek Diamonds" by Yōko Hikasa and "Glory!" (グローリー！) by Suzuko Mimori. From episodes 26–51, the opening theme is "Perfect HERO" by Tom-H@ck featuring Masayoshi Ōishi, while the ending themes are "Mirai e Tsunage" (未来へつなげ) by DŌP and "CLOUD NINE" by Ryōta Ōsaka, Nobunaga Shimazaki, and Natsuki Hanae. From episodes 52–75, the opening theme is "Hashire! Mirai" (疾走れ！ミライ; Run Ahead Toward the Future!) by GLAY, while the ending themes are "PROMISED FIELD" by Ryōta Ōsaka, Nobunaga Shimazaki, and Natsuki Hanae and "FINAL VICTORY" by Ryōta Ōsaka featuring the Seido High School Baseball Team.



Episode list

References

Ace of Diamond episode lists
2013 Japanese television seasons
2014 Japanese television seasons
2015 Japanese television seasons